Francisco García Romero (1559–1630s) was a Spanish military man and conquistador.

Biography 
Francisco was born in 1559 in Cáceres, Spain, son of Francisco García Moroto and Inés Martin. He arrived in the Rio de la Plata in 1603, occupying distinguished political positions in the city, where served as alcalde, fiel ejecutor, attorney general and deputy of the Cabildo of Buenos Aires.

Francisco García Romero married in Asunción to Mariana González de Santa Cruz, daughter of Bartolomé González de Villaverde and María Santa Cruz, belonging to a distinguished family of conquerors.

References

External links 
 https://web.archive.org/web/20130617044301/http://www.eldiariolomense.com.ar/142.htm

1559 births
1630s deaths
Mayors of Buenos Aires
Spanish colonial governors and administrators
People from Buenos Aires
Year of death uncertain
Río de la Plata